There are several video games based on Tite Kubo's manga and anime series Bleach. The titles consist mostly of side-scrolling fighters, but also include other genres such as strategy role-playing games and action role-playing games. Most of the games retell the plot of the manga, following Ichigo Kurosaki and his friends. Some games, however, have veered from the source material and incorporated original stories and characters. The games have been released on a variety of home and handheld consoles.

The first game to be released based on the Bleach series was Bleach: Heat the Soul, which debuted on March 24, 2005, and the latest releases are Bleach: Soul Resurrección, which was released in North America on August 2, 2011 and Bleach: Bankai Batoru, a social network game which was released in Japan on April 14, 2014. There are 23 games bearing the "Bleach" name, not including the four crossover games—Jump Super Stars, Jump Ultimate Stars, J-Stars Victory VS and Jump Force—which feature characters from numerous other Weekly Shōnen Jump anime and manga series. Most Bleach games have been released only in Japan, though Sega has localized the first Wii game and the first three Nintendo DS games for North America, Australia, and Europe. Reception toward the games has been mixed, ranging from "the best fighter" for Bleach: The Blade of Fate, to "(not) a bad first effort, but the competition is leaving this one in the dust" for Bleach: Shattered Blade.

Series

Bleach: Blade Battlers

The  series is a series of 3-D cel-shaded fighting games developed by Racjin and published by Namco.

Bleach DS
The Bleach DS series are 2-D games. The first two were fighting games developed by Treasure Co. Ltd. All four were published by Sega.

Bleach Nintendo Home Consoles

The Bleach Nintendo Home Console series is a series of fighting games published by Konami, with the first two being developed by Polygon Magic and Versus Crusade being developed by Treasure Co. Ltd.

Bleach: Heat the Soul

The  series is a series of fighting games developed by Eighting and published by Namco.

Bleach: Soul Carnival
The  series is a list of action role-playing games developed and published by Bandai Namco Games.

Single games

Other games

Notes

References

External links
 Official PlayStation Bleach website 
 Official Fighting website 

 
Bleach video games
Bleach